The Oakwood Heights station is a Staten Island Railway station in the neighborhood of Oakwood, Staten Island, New York.

History 

The station opened as Richmond on April 23, 1860, with the opening of the Staten Island Railway from Vanderbilt's Landing to Eltingville. The station was named Richmond as the station was on the border between Richmond and Oakwood. Afterwards, sometime around 1885 the station was renamed Court House. The station was a flag stop. The station was later renamed Oakwood, and then finally Oakwood Heights after the other neighborhood on the border of the station. A 1909 timetable calls the station Oakwood Heights, but puts Court House in parentheses.

Station layout 

The station is located on an open cut at Guyon Avenue and Railroad Avenue. It has two side platforms and beige painted walls. This station is used frequently by students of the nearby Monsignor Farrell High School.

Exits
The north end has an overpass with two exits, one to Oak Avenue for the northbound platform, and the other to Cedarview Avenue for the southbound platform side. Another exit at the south end leads to Guyon Avenue.

Bus connection

References

External links

Staten Island Railway station list
Staten Island Railway general information
 Guyon Avenue entrance from Google Maps Street View
 Cedarview Avenue entrance from Google Maps Street View
 Platform level from Google Maps Street View

Staten Island Railway stations
Railway stations in the United States opened in 1860
1860 establishments in New York (state)